Charles Randolph Thomas (February 7, 1827 – February 18, 1891), was an attorney and politician; he was elected as  U.S. Congressional Representative from North Carolina during the Reconstruction era. He was the father of Charles R. Thomas (1861-1931), also a politician.

Thomas was born in Beaufort, NC, February 7, 1827.  He attended a private school in Hillsboro, North Carolina (there was no public education). He was graduated from the University of North Carolina at Chapel Hill in 1849. He studied law, and was admitted to the bar in 1850.

Career
He started a practice in Beaufort and moved to New Bern.  He also became involved in politics and was elected as a member of the State constitutional convention in 1861 to set up the new Confederate state.  He was appointed as North Carolina Secretary of State in 1864-1865.  After the war, he was appointed by the Governor as president of the Atlantic & North Carolina Railroad in 1867.  He became a judge of the superior court in 1868-1870.

Thomas was elected from North Carolina's 2nd congressional district as a Republican to the Forty-second and Forty-third Congresses (March 4, 1871 – March 3, 1875). He was an unsuccessful candidate for Republican renomination in 1874, losing to John A. Hyman, the first African American elected to Congress from the state.

Thomas returned to his law practice in New Bern. He died there February 18, 1891. He is buried in Cedar Grove Cemetery.

Notes
Congressional Biographical Directory

References

External links

1827 births
1891 deaths
University of North Carolina at Chapel Hill alumni
North Carolina state court judges
Secretaries of State of North Carolina
Politicians from New Bern, North Carolina
Republican Party members of the United States House of Representatives from North Carolina
19th-century American politicians
People from Beaufort, North Carolina
19th-century American judges